Emilios Theofanidis (30 November 1939 – 7 February 1999) was a Greek professional footballer who played as midfielder and a later manager.

Club career
Theofanidis started football from Aris Ptolemaidas where he distinguished himself competing in the second division, while in 1963 he emerged as the top scorer in his respective group.

In the summer of 1963, he took the big step of his career by transferring to the then Greek champion, AEK Athens. With the yellow-blacks, he played for 2 years, making his debut in the first division and remarkably, participated in both matches against Monaco for the qualifying phase of the European Cup, even scoring and 1 goal in the second leg in Athens on 2 October 1963 which ended 1–1. During his spell in the club he won a Greek Cup in 1964.

In the summer of 1965, he transferred to PAOK, where he played for 5 seasons and played in the first 2 European matches in the history of the club against the Wiener Sport-Club for the Inter-Cities Fairs Cup in 1965. He was also a finalist of the Greek Cup in the period 1970.

After football
After the end of his football career Theofanidis worked as a coach and among other things, in the infrastructure departments of PAOK and at Aris Ptolemaidas He died on 7 February 1999 at the age of 59. The Municipal Stadium of Ptolemaida has been named in his honor.

Honours

AEK Athens 
Greek Cup: 1963–64

Individual
Beta Ethniki top scorer: 1962–63 (4th Group)

References

1939 births
1999 deaths
Greek footballers
Super League Greece players
AEK Athens F.C. players
PAOK FC players
Association football midfielders
Footballers from Ptolemaida